Guoba Cuisine (In Tianjin dialect, homophony in Mandarin sounds like "Gaba Cuisine"), is a kind of authentic speciality and typical breakfast in Tianjin, China. There's nowhere to find its specific origin, as it is said to have a history of over 300 years. Guoba Cuisine is well-known for its salty but delicious taste. It used to be divided into two categories: vegetarian and meat, though only the vegetarian version is still popular today. Dafulai Guoba Cuisine is the most representative time-honored brand in terms of Guoba Cuisine in Tianjin. In 1997, Dafulai Guoba cuisine was ranked among the first batch of "Famous Chinese Snacks" by the Chinese Cooking Association. Its cooking techniques had also already been listed in the second batch of Intangible Cultural Heritage of Tianjin city in 2009.

Nowadays, Guoba Cuisine is most popular in its birthplace, Tianjin, while it is also sold in the Tianjin speciality restaurants in the Chinese gathering regions in America and Canada.

Background

Origin 
Guoba Cuisine is generally accepted to share a history of over 300 years till now. However, there is no concrete conclusion due to a lack of rigorous research. The stories recorded in Guidance of Local Specialty in Tianjin and Tianjin Folkways, include tales such as the examiners who passed Tianjin for the imperial civil examinations in Beijing who brought this snack to Tianjin and Qianlong and an emperor in Chinese Qing Dynasty who honored this snack with such a name. But these accounts are much more like folktales. According to General Record of Tianjin-part2: Business Record, many people from Shandong province, China, landed in Tianjin to make a living in the early years. They ground the mung bean and rice together into pastes with the levigator and then used the pastes to make mung bean pancakes. The mung bean pancakes were cut into pieces shaped like salix leaves, the so-called "Guoba"("Gaba" in Tianjin dialect). The peddlers carried buckets of pre-made thick gravy and hawked along the streets and lanes. For sale, they stir the Guoba into the pre-made thick gravy added with condiments. Such a kind of snack functions both as congee and staple food, so it is widely welcomed by the masses. During the Kangxi Period of the Qing Dynasty, the litterateur Pu Songling's Ode to Pancake also described how Shandong people made pancake soup, which to some extent provides proof for this point of view. Some others also thought that Guoba Cuisine originates from Dfulai, while Dafulai's cooking techniques of Guoba Cuisine had it sourced from the "Zhang's Pancake Store" owned by the couple Zhang Lan and Guo Ba in the 22nd year of the Qianlong Period(1757).

History 
Guoba cuisine is a unique speciality which exists exclusively in Tianjin. Despite its history of over 300 years, few reliable reports remained of its early years. According to General Record of Tianjin: Folk Custom Record, the breakfast shops and stalls had been spread all over Tianjin city, dating back to the 1930s, among which ten had set up their own brands. As a result of the improvement of its cooking techniques as well as the high quality of its ingredients, Guoba Cuisine was commonly accepted and loved by Tianjin citizens. There used to be 4 catering industry associations in Tianjin in 1946, though Guoba Cuisine is not covered by them, it appeared quite frequently in the breakfast shops there. During the 1940s, in the Guoba Cuisine market, "Dafulai" and "Wanshuncheng" were the two best-known brands. Da fulai Guoba Cuisine store was located in the traditional gathering area for the Hui ethnic groups in Tianjin, which makes it a representative Hui type. Zhang Qifa, the 2nd generation founder of Dafulai, made it a great success via high-quality ingredients and combination of different tastes. On the contrary, Wanshuncheng was a typical Guoba cuisine shop for the Han ethnic group.

During the public-private joint management in 1956, all privately-owned Guoba Cuisine shops were transferred into state-owned ones. They were all listed among state-owned catering enterprises as snack shops or breakfast stores. The recipe and cooking techniques of Dafulai were changed from being handed down by the Zhang's family to being passed down from masters to apprentices since Dafulai had been turned into a state-run restaurant rather than a private enterprise by Zhang Fengxiang, last head of the Zhangs in response to the government's appeal. The sizable Dafulai Guoba Cuisine was incorporated as a part of Hongqiao District Catering Company and then integrated into the Dafulai breakfast department with many unknown shops. During the Cultural Revolution, the sale of Guoba Cuisine in Tianjin mainly relied on the breakfast department set by state-owned catering companies. Within such a period, Dafulai breakfast department, which sold mainly Guoba Cuisine was once named as "New Victory Breakfast Department", "Large Western Bend Breakfast Department", etc. In the Food Appreciation organized by Tianjin Catering Company, the Dafulai Guoba Cuisine from the Dafulai Guoba Cuisine store in Hongqiao District was among the ten best ones. When the appreciation was organized again in 1990, the Guoba Cuisine from the Zhenhua Breakfast shop in Hongqiao district retained its rank. Though the "Dafulai Guoba Cuisine cooking techniques" was listed in the second batch of "Intangible Cultural Heritage" in 2009, only Dafulai and some other time-honored brands are still in operation, while the other previously famous ones, such as Wanshuncheng, Zhangmaolin, and Baohexuan have all disappeared.

Cooking techniques

Ingredients 
Guoba cuisine is divided into three parts: Guoba (Gaba), thick gravy, and condiments. Grind the mung bean and millet together into thick liquid or directly mix the mung bean and millet flours in proportion, use the pastes to make thin pancakes, cool the pancakes down and cut them into pieces shaped like salix leaves, then you will get the main ingredient called Guoba (Gaba).  Stir-fry the sesame oil,  fermented flour sauce, smashed shallot, smashed ginger, spices and star anise powder together to make the sauce. Boil the pre-made sauce with soy sauce, salt, smashed ginger, spice powder, star anise powder and starch paste together using the oil fried before with the root of coriander as the base oil  Afterwards, put the Guoba into the thick gravy, softly stir it until it is thoroughly into the thick gravy. Then remove all into the bowl, and add it with the sesame sauce cooked with chili oil and sesame oil, as well as some other condiments such as fermented bean curd liquid, coriander leaves and pot-stewed dried bean curd, etc. More than 40 main ingredients and condiments are used in total in the cooking techniques of Dafulai Guoba Cuisine, which is listed in Intangible Cultural Heritage List.

Techniques 
The Technical Standard and Criteria for Well-known Traditional Tianjin Speciality Snacks summarizes the main-stream cooking techniques of Guoba Cuisine and set it as the non-binding standard for the industry groups.

According to the Industry Group Standard, the Guoba is supposed to be made of thick liquid out of the ground mung bean and millet in proportions (generally 7:3). Then pour the liquid into a container, add pure water and seasonings to make pastes. Heat the thin pancakes in a pancake griddle and then cut them into diamond pieces or pieces like salix leaves after cooling down. Dry the pieces by airing them to get Guoba.  The thick gravy is made of shallot, ginger, star anise and some other condiments in addition to soy sauce. When both of the two have been accomplished, put the main ingredient Guoba onto the container filled with thick gravy, mix them thoroughly. Move them into the bowl together added with smashed coriander, sesame sauce(peanut butter）preserved bean curd, chilli oil and some other condiments, so that it is called Guoba Cuisine  . As is mentioned by General Record of Tianjin-two: Business Record, the traditional Guoba cuisine shop also served the cuisine with freshly fried diamond pieces of smoked bean curd in addition to preserved bean curd to make it tastes mellow and emphasize its unique flavour.

Industrial standard 
The series of standards named The Technical Standard and Criteria for Well-known Traditional Tianjin Speciality Snacks was drafted by the group led by the Tianjin Catering Industry Association under the support of the Tianjin Municipal Commission of Commerce and Tianjin Municipal Market Supervision and Administration Commission in 2006. In addition to  Guoba cuisine, Jianbing guozi, Dried tuckahoe cake from Yang Town, Mahua, etc are all covered in the standard.

On May 16, 2018, Tianjin Ctering Industry Association publish firstly the group standard for T/TJCY 002-2018The Technical Standard and Criteria for Well-known Traditional Tianjin Speciality Snacks: Jianbing guozi. The standard functions only as a group one rather than compulsory. Memberships of the association could apply it on agreement while non-memership social organisers can apply it voluntarily. Such a standard had once aroused heated discussion. Following this standard, in January, 2019,The Technical Standard and Criteria for Well-known Traditional Tianjin Speciality Snacks: Guoba Cuisine was also published as a group standard.

Some of the customers hold the belief that for traditional Tianjin snacks such as Guoba cuisine, there's no necessity to promote a unified standard. They are worried that the unique tastes from different Guoba cuisine shops will disappear.

Culture and popularity 

Up till now, Guoba cuisine just as Jianbing guozi, still plays an important tole in the food culture of Tianjin, especially as one of the most popular and unique breakfast dishes. Guoba cuisine is always in accompanion with sesame seed cake, beef pancake,etc during the breakfast.

Time-honored Brands 
During the 1940s, "Dafulai" and "Wanshuncheng" both ranked in the top in the Guoba Cuisine market in Tianjin. Dfulai Guoba Cuisine shop is a representative of the Muslims of the Hui ethnic group, while Wanshuncheng is a typical non-Muslim one for Han ethnic group. Afterwards, Wanshuncheng was integrated into the Beijing-Tianjin snack shop on Liaoning Road and up till now it has already disappeared. Many famous local time-honored brands of Guoba cuisine in Tianjin had declined in the past, only Dafulai and Zhensucheng, etc are still in operation, while the others passed with the time, such as Wanshuncheng, Zhangmaolin and Baohexuan. The original site of Dafulai was 29th of Old Tianjin city, in front of the land temple(north-western corner, the "large western bend). After the public-private joint management in 1956, Dafulai Guoba cuisine shop was merged into the catering company in a state-owned catering company in the Hongqiao district, and then integrated into a breakfast shop with some nameless breakfast shops, the brand name “Dafulai”was once quited. It was not until the early years of Chinese reform and opening up that the name was put into use again. Dafulai catering management Ltd was founded in 2005, which specialized in  breakfast snacks include Guoba cuisine. Another Guoba Cuisine shop with a good reputation is Zhensucheng, which was previously a sesame oil brand. In other word, Zhensucheng sesame oil workshop in the Santiaoshi region of Tianjin set up by people from Cangzhou. It was nationalized in 1956. The children of its founder once worked in state-owned breakfast shop. In 1979, they operate their own breakfast shop with the brand name inherited from their parents near the Ciadaokou street of Jingang Bridge District, which is close to where they live due to unemployment. After decades of organization, Zhensucheng has now become a chain breakfast shop with over 20 direct outlets.

Popularity 

Guoba Cuisine is greatly favoured by local Tianjin people and those who moved from Tianjin to somewhere else. For example, Deng Yingchao, chairman of the 6th Chinese People's Political Consultative Conference, who used to study in Tianjin when she was young, had a special affection for Guoba Cuisine and Jianbing guozi in Tianjin. In interviews about Tianjin diets, many Tianjin citizens also regard Guoba Cuisine and Jianbing guozi as the most typical ones in Tianjin diets.

Guoba Cuisine, as one of the remarkable authentic regional specialities, is an appointed food served by the Tianjin Government to treat national leaders as well as guests from both home and abroad. Former Chinese Chairman Liu Shaoqi highly remarked Guoba Cuisine when he tasted it during his inspection of Tianjin, In 2008, Chen Deming, at that time Chinese Minister of Commerce raved about it after tasting the Dafulai Guoba cuisine when holding conferences in Binhai New area. In foreign affairs organized by the Tianjin government such as Summer Davos Forum, Guoba Cuisine, Jianbing guozi along with some other snacks all function as dishes for the banquets. Since January, 26th, 2020,  almost 1,300 doctors and nurses were selected and sent to Hubei province to support their prevention and control of Covid-19. At the same time,  a group of cooks were also dispatched to cook authentic Tianjin breakfast such as Guoba Cuisine and Jianbing guozi for those doctors and nurses from Tianjin, thus emphasizing the importance of Guoba cuisine in Tianjin food culture.

Due to a lack of promotion, Guoba Cuisine is not as popular as Jianbing guozi, which means that it is commonly seen only in Tianjin. After being listed among the Intangible Cultural Heritages, Guoba cuisine also faces difficulty in terms of how to improve its productivity, which makes it hard to introduce it in a large scale, As a representative Tianjin cuisine, Guoba cuisine has appeared in Tianjin-taste restaurants in Chinese gathering areas in cities such as New York and Monterey Park, the USA, as well as Niagara, Canada, etc. With the development of E-business, Guoba cuisine could also be purchased online.

See also 

 Tianjin cuisine
 Jianbing guozi
 Wonton

References 

Rice dishes